Salem Mitchell (born 1998) is an American model. She is known for her numerous facial freckles. Mitchell was discovered through Instagram and is currently signed to LA Ford Models and New York Model Management.

Early life and education
Mitchell was born and raised in San Diego, California and is African American. Her grandmother is Filipino. She studied dance at San Diego School of Creative and Performing Arts and graduated in 2016. After high school she enrolled at San Diego State University to study business marketing.

Career

Modeling 
Mitchell amassed a large following through Instagram. One day Mitchell posted a photo of herself on Twitter next to a bruised banana in response to trolls who had compared her freckles to the overripe fruit. After the photo went viral, Paper Magazine writer Maiya Toledano contacted Mitchell through Instagram and invited her to do a feature shoot. Mitchell later signed to Ford Models.

Mitchell has appeared in music videos for artists such as SZA and Cardi B. She has worked with retailers including GAP, Converse, and SavagexFenty. Her first cover was for Numéro Berlin. She was asked by Beyoncé to model official apparel related to Lemonade.

Other work 
Mitchell has been the target of cyberbullying for her freckles and was once called "ghetto" by internet commenters. A response she wrote on Instagram Stories that discussed cultural appropriation and the devaluation of Black features on African American women was covered by Teen Vogue.

In 2019 Mitchell collaborated with Known Supply to develop an eco-friendly limited edition collection of apparel called Only Human. She is an advocate for making the fashion industry more sustainable.

Accolades 

 2019 - Nominee, Best of Social Media, Fashion, 11th Shorty Awards

References

External links 
Salem Mitchell on LA Ford Models
Official Instagram

1998 births
Living people
Female models from California
African-American female models
Models from San Diego
21st-century American women
21st-century African-American people
21st-century African-American women